Drew Gitlin (born May 26, 1958) is a former professional tennis player from the United States.

As a qualifier, Gitlin reached the third round of the gentlemen's singles event at Wimbledon in 1982 where he lost to eventual champion Jimmy Connors.  Gitlin reached a career high singles ranking of world No. 58 in January, 1983. During his career, he won three doubles titles and reached a doubles ranking of world No. 38 in April 1985.

Gitlin resided in Encino, California during his tour playing days.

Career finals

Doubles (3 wins, 6 losses)

External links
 
 

American male tennis players
People from Encino, Los Angeles
Tennis players from Los Angeles
Living people
1958 births